Bubble is a visual programming language, a no-code development platform and an application platform as a service, developed by Bubble Group, that enables non-technical people to build web applications without needing to type code. Instead, users draw the interface by dragging and dropping elements onto a page and defining workflows to control the logic. Bubble's vision is to make hand-coding for web applications largely obsolete.

Overview

Bubble's visual development platform is used to create websites and web applications with more advanced functionality than what is possible with template-oriented website builders such as Wix and Squarespace. It is used by non-technical startup founders, in schools for education purposes, and by other organizations for commercial purposes.

Bubble allows users to build web applications including social media sites like Twitter, marketplaces like Airbnb and Uber, services like Instacart, and more through tutorials. Bubble offers its own API integrations, templates and plugins. Users of the platform have also created new third-party templates, plugins and service built within the Bubble eco-system.

History
Bubble was founded by Emmanuel Straschnov and Josh Haas in 2012 in New York. Bubble has been bootstrapped for seven years. In 2019, Bubble raised $6M from SignalFire, Neo, Nas, Eric Ries and the founders of Warby Parker, Allbirds, Okta, Harry's. Bubble was named one of Fast Company's Most Innovative Companies of 2021. Web traffic to Bubble's websites have increased at a compounded growth rate of greater than 50% from 2017 to 2021.

References

External links
 

Visual programming languages
2012 software